Variability is how spread out or closely clustered a set of data is.

Variability may refer to:

Biology
Genetic variability, a measure of the tendency of individual genotypes in a population to vary from one another
Heart rate variability, a physiological phenomenon where the time interval between heart beats varies
Human variability, the range of possible values for any measurable characteristic, physical or mental, of human beings

Other sciences
Climate variability, changes in the components of Earth's climate system and their interactions
Spatial variability, when a quantity that is measured at different spatial locations exhibits values that differ across the locations
Statistical variability, a measure of dispersion in statistics

See also
Variability hypothesis, nineteenth century hypothesis that males have a greater range of ability than females
 Variable (disambiguation)
Variable renewable energy, a renewable energy source of a fluctuating nature
Variance, a specific measure of statistical dispersion
Variation (disambiguation)